Maximikha is a rural locality (a selo) in Barguzinsky District, Republic of Buryatia, Russia. The population was 297 as of 2010. There are 26 streets.

Geography 
Maximikha is located 83 km southwest of Barguzin (the district's administrative centre) by road. Ust-Barguzin is the nearest rural locality.

References 

Rural localities in Barguzinsky District
Populated places on Lake Baikal